Jonas Tilly (born 29 June 1984) is a freestyle swimmer from Sweden. He was a member of the Swedish world record team in 4x50m freestyle at the European Short Course Swimming Championships 2006 together with Marcus Piehl, Petter Stymne and Stefan Nystrand. Studied at University of California and swum in their swim team between 2003 and 2006.

Clubs
Trelleborgs SS

References 
 

1984 births
Living people
Swedish male freestyle swimmers
Medalists at the FINA World Swimming Championships (25 m)